is a passenger railway station located in the city of Kasukabe, Saitama, Japan, operated by the private railway operator Tōbu Railway. The station is numbered "TD-11".

Lines

Station layout
The station consists of two ground-level opposing side platforms serving two tracks, connected to the station building by a footbridge.

Platforms

Adjacent stations

History
It was renamed Fujino-ushima on 5 March 1931.

From 17 March 2012, station numbering was introduced on all Tobu lines, with Fujino-ushijima Station becoming "TD-11".

Passenger statistics
In fiscal 2019, the station was used by an average of 7,141 passengers daily.

Surrounding area
Ushijima Wisteria (Special National Natural Monument)
Kasukabe – Ushijima Post Office

See also
 List of railway stations in Japan

References

External links

  

Railway stations in Saitama Prefecture
Tobu Noda Line
Stations of Tobu Railway
Railway stations in Japan opened in 1930
Kasukabe, Saitama